Begum is a female royal and aristocratic title from Central and South Asia.

Begum or Begüm may refer to:

People
 Begum (name), a given name and surname
 Padshah Begum, an imperial title of the Mughal Empire

Arts, entertainment, and media
Begum (magazine), a Bengali-language news magazine in Bangladesh
Ami Sirajer Begum, an Indian Bengali television historical soap opera
Begum Jaan, 2017 Indian Hindi period drama film
Alsana Begum, a character in the television serial White Teeth
Malik Begum, a character in the web series Corner Shop Row

Places
Begum Bazar, biggest commercial market in Hyderabad, India
Begum Pur, a census town in North West district in the state of Delhi, India
Begumpet, a neighborhood in Hyderabad, Andhra Pradesh, India
Bahu Begum ka Maqbara, a royal tomb in Faizabad, India